The Angelburg is a hill in Hesse, Germany. At an elevation of 609 metres above sea level, its peak is located in Lahn-Dill-Kreis district, near the local centre of Hirzenhain-Bahnhof, which is part of Eschenburg. 

Hills of Hesse
Lahn-Dill-Kreis
Hills of the Gladenbach Uplands